Chronicle is the third studio album by Swedish cinematic postrock band Lights & Motion.

Description 

Chronicle was released worldwide on 13 January 2015, through the American independent record label Deep Elm Records, which also released the band's two previous albums. The album was produced and mixed by Christoffer Franzén and recorded in Gothenburg during 2014. It was mastered by Dave Cooley (M83) at Elysian Masters, LA.

The album contains nine tracks and has a total running time of 37 minutes.

Reception 

British magazine Rock Sound gave the album an 8/10 rating, calling it "Awe-Inspiring".

Style

Chronicle features a very detailed and big production behind its core frame of pianos, drums, synths and electric guitars. The combination of a solid foreground and a broad ambient background gives it a widescreen/panoramic "big canvas" feel. It has often been described as "Cinematic", in how elements of film music are fused with a more traditional postrock setting.

Artwork

The artwork for Chronicle was made by Will Sutton.

Trivia

 Songs "Fireflies" and "Glow"  were featured in The Vampire Diaries.

Track listing
All songs composed by Christoffer Franzén.

Personnel

Lights & Motion
 Christoffer Franzén –  Vocals, electric guitar, acoustic guitar, bass guitar, drums, percussion, keyboards, programming, piano, synthesizer, glockenspiel,  orchestration, sound design, string arrangements

References

2015 albums
Lights & Motion albums
Deep Elm Records albums